"Home Bound" is an instrumental by American rock musician Ted Nugent; it is his fifth single. It's the fifth track on his most famous album, Cat Scratch Fever. It was sampled by the Beastie Boys and Biz Markie as "The Biz vs the Nuge" on the album Check Your Head in 1992.

Chart positions

References

1977 singles
Ted Nugent songs
Rock instrumentals
Songs written by Ted Nugent
Song recordings produced by Tom Werman
1977 songs